Crossley Tatui is a Niuean politician and member of the Niue Assembly.

Tatui is a graduate of the University of the South Pacific, with a degree in Public Administration and Accounting. He worked as a public servant, initially as a clerk and then in a number of senior roles including Director of Parliamentary Services and Head of External Affairs. He is a lay preacher in the Ekalesia Niue Church.

Tatui was first elected to the Niue Assembly on the common roll in the 2011 Niuean general election. He was re-elected in 2014, 2017, and again in the 2020 election.

On June 11 2020 Tatui was appointed Minister of Finance and Infrastructure in the Cabinet of Dalton Tagelagi. As Minister of Finance he oversaw Niue's ratification of the PACER Plus regional trade agreement.

References

Living people
Members of the Niue Assembly
University of the South Pacific alumni
Niuean Congregationalists
Year of birth missing (living people)
Finance Ministers of Niue